Wheatland is an unincorporated community in Loudoun County, Virginia located north of Purcellville and south of Lovettsville on Berlin Turnpike (VA 287). Originally located at the intersection of Berlin Turnpike and the Charles Town Pike (State Route 9), the present day road bed of Charles Town Pike lies south of its historical right of way so the village is just north of that intersection.

Unincorporated communities in Loudoun County, Virginia
Washington metropolitan area
Unincorporated communities in Virginia